The Barbier–Wieland degradation is a procedure for shortening the carbon chain of a carboxylic acid by one carbon. It only works when the carbon adjacent to the carboxyl is a simple methylene bridge (an aliphatic carbon with no substituents). The reaction sequence involves conversion of the carboxyl and alpha carbon into an alkene, which is then cleaved by oxidation to convert the former alpha position into a carboxyl itself.

References

Name reactions
Carboxylic acids
Degradation reactions